Gino Fechner (born 5 September 1997) is a German professional footballer who plays as a midfielder for Wehen Wiesbaden. He is the son of former footballer Harry Fechner.

He was a youth international for Germany.

References

1997 births
Living people
Sportspeople from Bochum
Association football midfielders
German footballers
Germany youth international footballers
RB Leipzig II players
RB Leipzig players
1. FC Kaiserslautern players
KFC Uerdingen 05 players
SV Wehen Wiesbaden players
Regionalliga players
2. Bundesliga players
3. Liga players
Footballers from North Rhine-Westphalia